Informatized warfare of China is the implementation of information warfare (IW) within the People's Liberation Army (PLA) and other organizations of the Chinese Communist Party (CCP). Laid out in the Chinese Defence White Paper of 2008, informatized warfare includes the utilization of information-based weapons and forces, including battlefield management systems, precision-strike capabilities, and technology-assisted command and control (C4ISR). However, some media and analyst report also uses the term to describe the political and espionage effort from the Chinese state.

Definitions
People's Liberation Army defines the term informatization to describe the implementation of information technology in the digital age, and as an evaluation criteria of its military modernization effort. The Chinese military leadership aims to transform PLA from conducting people's war to engage in warfare conditions of informatization, which includes moving the military doctrine from weapon platform-centric to cyber-centric. The indicated characteristic of the cyber-centric force is the utilization of network linkages (data-link) among platforms.

United States-China Economic and Security Review Commission defines "Informationization" and informatized warfare in Chinese military doctrine as follows: "[A]t the operational level appears focused on providing an integrated platform for joint war-zone command, control, communications, computer, intelligence, surveillance, and reconnaissance (C4ISR) connectivity, and for peacetime command and control (C2) within the PLA’s Military Regions."

United States Defense Intelligence Agency defines China's "informatized warfare" as similar to U.S. military's concept of net-centric capability, which means the military's capability to use advanced information technology and communications systems to gain operational advantage over an adversary.

In 1995, the father of Chinese IW, Major General Wang Pufeng, wrote "Information war is a crucial stage of high-tech war... At its heart are information technologies, fusing intelligence war, strategic war, electronic war, guided missile war, a war of "motorization" [jidong zhan], a war of firepower [huoli]—a total war. It is a new type of warfare."

In two articles in the Liberation Army Daily, of 13 and 20 June 1995, Senior Colonel Wang Baocun and Li Fei of the Academy of Military Science, Beijing, noted several definitions. They concluded:
'We hold that information warfare has both narrow and broad meanings. Information warfare in the narrow sense refers to the U.S. military's so-called "battlefield information warfare," the crux of which is "command and control warfare." It is defined as the comprehensive use, with intelligence support, of military deception, operational secrecy, psychological warfare, electronic warfare, and substantive destruction to assault the enemy's whole information system including personnel; and to disrupt the enemy's information flow, in order to impact, weaken, and destroy the enemy's command and control capability, while keeping one's own command and control capability from being affected by similar enemy actions.'

They went on to state:

A July 1998 conference held in San Diego, sponsored jointly by the RAND Center for Asia-Pacific Policy and the Taiwan-based Chinese Council of Advanced Policy Studies, "brought together Chinese military experts to discuss the non-hardware side of the People's Liberation Army's modernization." In his presentation, James C. Mulvenon stated: "Chinese writings clearly suggest that IW is a solely military subject, and as such, they draw inspiration primarily from U.S. military writings. The net result of this "borrowing" is that many PLA authors' definitions of IW and IW concepts sound eerily familiar."

In December 1999, Xie Guang, the then Vice Minister of Science & Technology and Industry for National Defence, defined IW as:
"IW in military sense means overall use of various types (of) information technologies, equipment and systems, particularly his command systems, to shake determination of enemy’s policy makers and at the same time, the use of all the means possible to ensure that that one’s own systems are not damaged or disturbed".

In a strategic analysis paper for the Indian Institute for Defence Studies and Analyses written in 2006, Vinod Anand examines the definitions of Chinese Information Warfare. He notes that although Chinese understanding of IW was initially based on western concepts, it has increasingly moved towards evolving its own orientation.

This list omits an element that plays a large role in Chinese IW and IO: computer network operations.

Background
China's interest in information warfare began after the United States victory in the first Gulf War (1990–1991). U.S. success was the result of information technologies and the total dominance it was able to provide in the battle space. From that point forward, the PLA began to seriously invest in and develop its own concepts of information warfare and what they mean to China.

The idea of a revolution in military affairs including information warfare has arisen as a school of thought in Chinese warfare. China's leadership has continuously stressed using asymmetric techniques to counter more powerful nations, such as the United States, and information warfare is a tool that the PLA uses to achieve their goals.

While China has adopted the idea of information dominance, its method for going about information dominance differs, using ancient political warfare methods such as the Thirty-Six Stratagems.

Nature 
The Chinese strategy of information warfare focuses on the use of what China calls "strategems" to build and maintain information superiority. These strategems help China compensate for its deficiencies in technology-based weapons, and may contain efforts to create cognitive errors and to influence the contents, process, and direction of thinking of an adversary. Cyberspace operations are used to achieve information dominance through reconnaissance and espionage, conducting network intrusions to steal and possibly alter data.

The Chinese concept of "Unrestricted Warfare" combines elements of information operations, cyberspace operations, irregular warfare, lawfare, and foreign relations, carried out in peacetime, as well as in conflict. The United States is viewed as a militarily superior foe whose advantages can be overcome through strategy and information operations. The U.S. reliance on technology, both in the military and in the civilian population, creates a vulnerability that can be exploited, along with "theoretical blind spots" and "thought errors", such as the absence of a comprehensive theory in United States Department of Defense doctrine that combines all elements of information warfare.

In cyberspace, computer network espionage plays a large role in Chinese efforts to pursue a competitive advantage. In 2009, China was suspected of stealing large terabytes of design data for the F-35 Joint Strike Fighter from defense contractor Lockheed Martin's computers. In 2012, a Chinese version, the J-31, appeared to rival the F-35. In 2014, a Chinese national was indicted for theft of sensitive trade secrets defense contractors, particularly data relating to Boeing's C-17 military transport aircraft. Industrial espionage such as this yields economic benefits, as well as military and national security advantages for China, while eroding the technical superiority of the United States. Another concern with this type of espionage is that detailed knowledge of the F-35 and C-17 platforms could afford China the ability to hack a plane's command and control system, to alter its course or possibly disable it in a time of crisis. In addition, a network intrusion could allow an undetectable cyber weapon to be planted, lying dormant until activated during a conflict.

On the defensive side, China employs a combination of legal policies and information technology for censorship and surveillance of dissenters in a program called "The Golden Shield". This is often referred to as "The Great Firewall" of China. In addition, the People's Republic of China actively promotes the idea of "cyber sovereignty", putting borders on the internet based on territorial integrity. This may be a way for the government to bypass the democratic free-flow of information that the internet represents.

Reportedly, the CIA has chronicled China's information warfare activities inside the United States, where financial incentives such as personnel and support in funding are aimed at academic institutions and think tanks to dissuade them from research that paints China in a negative light. In a February 2018 hearing before the Senate Intelligence Committee, FBI Director Christopher Wray described so-called Confucius Institutes, Chinese language and cultural centers at universities that may be used as espionage tools to influence public opinion or to stifle academic freedom by limiting or disallowing discussions on certain topics. China has invested heavily in the motion picture industry as a way to gain cultural and economic influence, though reportedly China's relationship with Hollywood has started to cool.

China has also been propagating an image of itself as a peaceful, nonthreatening nation focused on internal development rather than the pursuit of international power. UN Statements such as CCP general secretary Xi Jinping's administration "will never pursue hegemony, expansion, or sphere of influence" exemplify these attempts at influencing perception. Chinese information warfare doctrine suggests that these tactics are part of a broader strategy of encouraging complacency in potential adversaries. Other tactics include using international fora to promote the idea of arms control for "information weapons" in order to maintain control over its own information apparatus and to level the playing field with technologically advanced powers.

Chinese disinformation operations have continued to evolve with operations in 2021 being significantly more sophisticated and resilient than operations in 2019. China has devoted significant human and financial resources to their operations.

Asymmetric warfare

The PLA places an emphasis on asymmetric warfare, particularly using information warfare to compensate for technological inferiority. In a 2001 paper in the U.S. Military Review, T. L. Thomas examines the writings of Major General Dai Qingmin (Director of the PLA's Communications Department of the General Staff responsible for IW and IO), Senior Colonel Wang Baocun (of the PLA's Academy of Military Sciences) and others on the ways that China is employing "Electronic Strategies" to realise the benefits of asymmetric warfare. Thomas also summarises the April 2000 issue of the Chinese journal China Military Science which contains three articles on information warfare subjects. The only article written in English ("The Current Revolution in Military Affairs and its Impact on Asia-Pacific Security," by Senior Colonel Wang Baocun) presents a quite different approach to an article Wang Baocun wrote only three years previously where he presented a description of IW which contained the elements of Soviet/Russian military science.

In the article "On Information Warfare Strategies", by Major General Niu Li, Colonel Li Jiangzhou and Major Xu Dehui (of the Communications and Command Institute), the authors define IW stratagems as "schemes and methods devised and used by commanders and commanding bodies to seize and maintain information supremacy on the basis of using clever methods to prevail at a relatively small cost in information warfare."

Informationization

Information warfare is a subset of informationization. As a result of technological advancement, China has now entered an era where Informationization is the military concept of the present and future. Informationization "entails embracing all the opportunities and technologies the Information Age can offer and integrating them into military systems".

China's 2004 White Paper on National Defense outlines the importance of informationization.
"The PLA, aiming at building an informationalised force and winning an information war, deepens its reforms, dedicates itself to innovation, improves its quality and actively pushes forward the RMA with Chinese characteristics with informationalization at its core."

The U.S. Department of Defense's 2009 Annual Report to Congress on "Military Power of the
People's Republic of China" defines local wars under conditions of informationization as "high intensity and short duration fighting against high technology adversaries" ... "capable of fighting and winning short-duration, high-intensity conflicts along its periphery against high-tech adversaries". Additionally, local war under informationization is an effort which seeks to fully develop and link land, air, sea, space and the electromagnetic spectrum into one system. China's military strategy is focused on fighting and winning "informationized local wars."

Three warfares 

China's "three warfares" strategy involves using public opinion (or media) warfare, psychological warfare and legal warfare (lawfare). 3W's was introduced in 2003.

Examples

COVID-19

The Chinese government has actively engaged in disinformation to downplay the emergence of COVID-19 in China and manipulate information about its spread around the world. In January 2023, Google stated that it shut down more than 50,000 accounts promoting disinformation about COVID-19, Taiwan, and U.S. politics. The accounts were part of a campaign that Mandiant named "Dragonbridge" linked to Chinese public relations firm Shanghai Haixun Technology Co.

Chinese information operations against the United States

Computer network operations, including cyber operations, are being undertaken by both Chinese citizens and the Chinese government. Because the United States has a weak critical infrastructure, it is vulnerable to Chinese cyber operations. As was described to the United States Congress:
"In 2007, the Department of Defense, other U.S. Government agencies and departments, and defense-related think tanks and contractors, experienced multiple computer network intrusions, many of which appeared to originate in the PRC".
Through a combination of overt and covert activities, China has sought to gain strategic political influence within the American government in order to affect policies and the political process. In the U.S., China employs efforts to "influence U.S. academics, journalists, think tank personnel and other shapers of public opinion..." China also aims to influence businessmen and politicians.

Influence operations 
Using a variety of methods, the PRC has recruited American agents of influence to advocate for Chinese interests in the United States. While many of these agents of influence serve China unwittingly, they can be very effective. A 1999 Congressional report found that "the Chinese Government continues to seek influence in Congress through various means, including inviting Congressional members to visit the PRC, lobbying ethnic Chinese voters and prominent U.S. citizens, and engaging U.S. business interests to weigh in on issues of mutual concern." Junkets were also effectively used by the Soviet Union as part of active measures to co-opt Western politicians, journalists, and academics.

China also uses its vast market as leverage in order to persuade American companies to lobby for Chinese interests. This is especially true of companies that deal in high technology or dual-use technology, as there are significant export controls placed on such technology. According to the 1999 Cox Report, "Executives wishing to do business in the PRC share a mutual commercial interest with the PRC in minimizing export controls on dual-use and military-related technologies. The PRC has displayed a willingness to exploit this mutuality of interest in several notoriously public cases by inducing VIPs from large U.S. companies to lobby on behalf of initiatives, such as export liberalization, on which they are aligned with the PRC."

U.S. elections 
Through its agents in America, the PRC has financed a number of political candidates. Katrina Leung, a Chinese spy, contributed $10,000 to the campaign of Richard Riordan, the former mayor of Los Angeles. When he lost his primary to Bill Simon Jr., Leung contributed $4,200 to Simon's campaign. At the direction of her Chinese handlers, Leung also contributed to the 1992 campaign of George H. W. Bush. It is estimated that Leung donated around $27,000 to politicians in the 1990s on behalf of the PRC.

A 2012 report by the Government Accountability Institute cites other examples: It was discovered that officers from the Chinese Embassy in Washington, D.C. "sought to direct contributions from foreign sources to the Democratic National Committee before the 1996 presidential campaign." While these allegations have been denied by the PRC, "Secret communications between Beijing and the Chinese Embassy in Washington establish that the influence-buying plan was 'government sanctioned...'"

In 1996, People's Liberation Army intelligence officer Gen. Ji Shengde provided Johnny Chung, a fundraiser for the Democratic National Committee, with $300,000 to donate towards President Bill Clinton's reelection. Chung visited the White House over fifty times during the 1996 presidential campaign, and was responsible for over $400,000 of contributions to the DNC. This money was returned after the election.

In September 2022, Meta Platforms removed fake accounts linked to a China-based influence operation ahead of the 2022 United States elections.

Chinese information operations against Taiwan

The PRC is actively seeking to unify Taiwan with China and uses information operations as an important part of that work. China's actions against Taiwan have been described as an active information war. Despite the large resource outlay the Chinese have been relatively ineffective in influencing the Taiwanese public. According to James C. Mulvenon rather than risk failure of a militarily forced unification, which could lead to international recognition of the independence of Taiwan, PRC leadership could potentially use computer network operations to undermine the will of Taiwan by attacking Taiwanese infrastructure.

In 2022 Taiwan's Ministry of Justice Investigation Bureau revealed that it had identified more than 400 social media accounts being used to push disinformation to Taiwanese citizens as part of Chinese content farms.

During the 2022 Chinese military exercises around Taiwan, Taiwanese officials accused the PLA of engaging in information warfare with claims of military exercises close to Penghu.

Chinese information operations against India 

The Times of India reported that during the 2017 Doklam standoff China used information warfare against India.

Chinese information operations against the Philippines 
In 2020, Facebook took down a Chinese network which was part of a disinformation campaign against the Philippines. The campaign used false profiles to influence public opinion, particularly related to politics. The campaign was dubbed "Operation Naval Gazing" by security researchers. Facebook is the dominant information source in the Philippines.

Platforms

Quora 
In 2018, the People's Daily, the official newspaper of the Central Committee of the Chinese Communist Party, reported on successful results from coordinated use of Quora in foreign propaganda campaigns.

Twitter 
In June 2020, Twitter shut down 23,750 primary accounts and approximately 150,000 booster accounts which were being used by China to conduct an information operation aimed at boosting China's global position during the COVID-19 outbreak as well as attacking traditional targets such as Hong Kong pro-democracy activists, Guo Wengui, and Taiwan. Twitter said that the accounts had pushed deceptive narratives and spread propaganda.

YouTube 
In August 2020 Google removed over 2,500 channels on YouTube which they suspected of spreading disinformation for China. The deleted channels mostly featured content in Chinese and included coverage of divisive issues like Black Lives Matter.

See also 
Anti-infiltration Act
Chinese intelligence activity abroad
List of cyber warfare forces
Unrestricted Warfare
Misinformation related to the COVID-19 pandemic
 COVID-19 misinformation by China
Document Number Nine

References

 
Military of the People's Republic of China
Information operations and warfare
Disinformation operations
Espionage in China
Cyberwarfare by China
Misinformation